Sanya (574) is a Type 054A frigate of the People's Liberation Army Navy. She was commissioned on 30 November 2012.

Development and design 

The Type 054A carries HQ-16 medium-range air defence missiles and anti-submarine missiles in a vertical launching system (VLS) system. The HQ-16 has a range of up to 50 km, with superior range and engagement angles to the Type 054's HQ-7. The Type 054A's VLS uses a hot launch method; a shared common exhaust system is sited between the two rows of rectangular launching tubes.

The four AK-630 close-in weapon systems (CIWS) of the Type 054 were replaced with two Type 730 CIWS on the Type 054A. The autonomous Type 730 provides improved reaction time against close-in threats.

Construction and career 
Sanya was launched on 30 November 2012 at the Hudong-Zhonghua Shipyard in Shanghai. Commissioned on 13 December 2013.

In mid-January 2014, the formation of Hengshui, Liuzhou, Yueyang and Sanya completed several offensive and defensive exercises in the training waters.

In March 2015, Sanya and other South Sea Fleet 9th destroyer detachment formation went to sea for practical weapon training. After Sanya arrived in the exercise area, she conducted training on shooting from the main gun to the shore.

Sanya and Liuzhou participated in the India's International Fleet Review in 2016, in which during an exercise, she sailed alongside USS Antietam, INS Mysore and INS Ranvijay.

Gallery

References 

2012 ships
Ships built in China
Type 054 frigates